The Silas Mumford Site, also known as the Tappan Site and RI-705, is a historic archaeological site in South Kingstown, Rhode Island.  Located in the northwestern part of the town, it includes a 19th-century homestead with an extensive household midden.

The site was listed on the National Register of Historic Places in 1984.

See also
National Register of Historic Places listings in Washington County, Rhode Island

References

Archaeological sites on the National Register of Historic Places in Rhode Island
Buildings and structures in South Kingstown, Rhode Island
National Register of Historic Places in Washington County, Rhode Island